Ole-Christian Rørvik (born 21 February 1989) is a Norwegian footballer goalkeeper who plays for Aalesund in Tippeligaen.

Club career
Prior to moving to Aalesund in 2011, Rørvik played for Skarbøvik in the Norwegian Second Division. He was the team's captain and considered one of the biggest talents in the third tier. Originally he was brought to Aalesund as the backup goalkeeper, but an injury prior to the 2011 season ruled this out. Instead Aalesund signed Jonas Sandqvist on a short-term deal.

He made his debut for Aalesund coming on as a substitute in the 89th minute against Brann on 27 November 2011 in the last round of the 2011 season. He made his first starting appearance on 1 May 2012 against Herd, in the Norwegian Cup.

Career statistics 

Source:

References

1989 births
Living people
Sportspeople from Ålesund
Association football goalkeepers
Norwegian footballers
Aalesunds FK players
Eliteserien players